Third-seeded Mervyn Rose defeated Luis Ayala 6–3, 6–4, 6–4 in the final to win the men's singles tennis title at the 1958 French Championships.

Seeds
The seeded players are listed below. Mervyn Rose is the champion; others show the round in which they were eliminated.

  Ashley Cooper (semifinals)
  Neale Fraser (quarterfinals)
  Mervyn Rose (champion)
  Budge Patty (fourth round)
  Luis Ayala (final)
  Jaroslav Drobný (fourth round)
  Jacques Brichant (semifinals)
  Giuseppe Merlo (quarterfinals)
  Robert Keith Wilson (second round)
  Orlando Sirola (fourth round)
  Pierre Darmon (quarterfinals)
  Nicola Pietrangeli (fourth round)
  Robert Haillet (quarterfinals)
  Paul Remy (fourth round)
  Kurt Nielsen (second round)
  Andrés Gimeno (fourth round)

Draw

Key
 Q = Qualifier
 WC = Wild card
 LL = Lucky loser
 r = Retired

Finals

Earlier rounds

Section 1

Section 2

Section 3

Section 4

Section 5

Section 6

Section 7

Section 8

External links
   on the French Open website

1958
1958 in French tennis